Russell Adam Winger (born August 2, 1984) is an American track and field athlete specializing in the discus throw and shot put. He competed in the discus throw at the 2015 World Championships in Beijing without qualifying for the final. In addition, he won the bronze medal at the 2015 Pan American Games and gold at the 2015 NACAC Championships.

His wife, Kara Winger is also an athlete, the North American Continental record holder in the javelin throw under her maiden name of Patterson.

Competition record

Personal bests
Outdoor
Shot put – 21.25 (Tucson 2010)
Discus throw – 66.04 (Chula Vista 2011)
Javelin throw – 64.54 (Claremont 2014)
Indoor
Shot put – 21.29 (Fayetteville 2008)

See also
 United States at the 2015 World Championships in Athletics

References

External links

Living people
1984 births
Sportspeople from Colorado Springs, Colorado
American male shot putters
American male discus throwers
World Athletics Championships athletes for the United States
Pan American Games track and field athletes for the United States
Athletes (track and field) at the 2011 Pan American Games
Athletes (track and field) at the 2015 Pan American Games
Pan American Games medalists in athletics (track and field)
Pan American Games bronze medalists for the United States
Medalists at the 2015 Pan American Games
Track and field athletes from Colorado